Helcystogramma flavescens is a moth of the family Gelechiidae. It is found in Russia (the southern Ural). The habitat consists of grassy steppes.

The wingspan is 18–19 mm. The forewings are uniform bright yellow and the hindwings are shiny yellowish white. Adults are on wing in early June.

Etymology
The species name is derived from Latin flavescens (meaning yellowish) and refers to the colour of the forewings.

References

Moths described in 2010
flavescens
Moths of Asia